Max Croiset (13 August 1912 – 7 April 1993) was a Dutch actor. He appeared in 30 films between 1934 and 1993. He starred in the film The Village on the River, which was entered into the 9th Berlin International Film Festival.

Filmography

References

External links

1912 births
1993 deaths
Dutch male dramatists and playwrights
Dutch male film actors
Dutch theatre directors
People from Blaricum
20th-century Dutch dramatists and playwrights
20th-century Dutch male actors